Better Looking Records is a record label with offices in Los Angeles and San Diego.  Founded in 1999, Paul Fischer, who DJ'd at KXLU college radio station in Los Angeles and worked at crank! Records, partnered with Dave Brown who ran Holiday Matinee Publicity and Muddle fanzine.  The label grew with each release and is now a part of the EastWest Records/ADA family of labels.

Artists

See also 
 List of record labels

External links 
 Official site

American record labels
Record labels established in 1999
1999 establishments in California